SGI may refer to:

Companies 
Saskatchewan Government Insurance
Scientific Games International, a gambling company
Silicon Graphics, Inc., a former manufacturer of high-performance computing products
Silicon Graphics International, formerly Rackable Systems, which acquired the former Silicon Graphics, Inc.
Smoking Gun Interactive, a video game company
Synthetic Genomics, Inc., an alternative fuels company

Other uses 
Saanich-Gulf Islands, a federal electoral district in British Columbia, Canada
Silicon Graphics Image, a graphics file format for Silicon Graphics workstations
Soka Gakkai International, a Nichiren Buddhist movement and also a non-governmental organization (NGO)
 SGI, the IATA code for Mushaf Airbase in Pakistan
Stargate Infinity, an animated television series 
Spheroidal graphite iron, another name for ductile iron
Sustainable Governance Indicators, statistics measuring the need for reform among Organisation for Economic Co-operation and Development countries

See also 
 SG1 (disambiguation)
 SGL (disambiguation)